Nicolaes Adriaensz. Verbeek (1582–1637), was a Dutch Golden Age brewer of Haarlem.

Biography
He was the son of Adriaen Thomasz. Verbeek, a Haarlem toll collector, and Hendrikje Jacobsdr. van Teylingen. He was the younger brother of Pieter Adriaensz Verbeek and became a judge and brewer in De Posthoorn. He married Geertruyd de Wael, the sister of his colleague Michiel de Wael in 1611. He became a captain of the St. George militia in Haarlem from 1624 to 1627 and from 1630 to 1633. He and his brother-in-law were portrayed by Frans Hals in The Banquet of the Officers of the St George Militia Company in 1627.

He died in Haarlem.

References

Nicolaes Adriaensz. Verbeek in De Haarlemse Schuttersstukken, by Jhr. Mr. C.C. van Valkenburg, pp. 50–51, Haerlem : jaarboek 1961, ISSN 0927-0728, on the website of the North Holland Archives

1582 births
1637 deaths
Frans Hals
Businesspeople from Haarlem
Dutch brewers